Captain John Dandridge Henley (25 February 1781 – 23 May 1835) was an officer of the United States Navy who served in the First Barbary War and the War of 1812.

Early life
Henley was born 25 February 1781 at Williamsburg, Virginia, the son of Leonard Henley and Elizabeth Dandridge (b. 1749) and the nephew of Martha Dandridge Custis Washington, the wife of George Washington. His younger brother was Robert Henley (1783–1828), also a naval officer.

Career
On 14 October 1799, at the age of 18, he was commissioned Midshipman by his uncle, George Washington.  During offensive operations against Tripoli in 1804, he served in Gunboat No. 6, commanded by Lieutenant John Trippe. In a stirring attack 3 August against a larger enemy warship, the two officers with only nine other men boarded and took the enemy ship in hand-to-hand fighting, although outnumbered three to one. Midshipman Henley also took part in several other attacks in the months that followed as Commodore Edward Preble's squadron carried out aggressive and successful operations against the Tripolitan pirates that made them ready to end their aggression.

Later in his career, during the War of 1812, Henley commanded schooner Carolina during the Battle of New Orleans. After the gallant delaying action by Lt. Thomas ap Catesby Jones at Lake Borgne, Carolina and other ships harassed the British with naval gunfire while protecting General Andrew Jackson's flank on the Mississippi River. Though his ship was destroyed, Henley contributed importantly to the large role the small squadron played in this last great victory of the war.

On 5 March 1817, he rose to the rank of captain.  Early in 1819 Henley commanded U.S. man-of war Congress to China, the first U.S. warship to visit that country. He continued to serve with distinction until 23 May 1835 when he died on board Vandalia at Havana, Cuba.

Personal life
On March 31, 1816, he married Elizabeth Denison (1788–1838), the daughter of Gideon Denison (1752–1799), an attorney from Hartford, Connecticut.  Together, they had three daughters:

 Frances Henley (1818–1873), who married Rev. Edward Y. Higbie (1800–1871), an Episcopal clergyman.
 Henrietta Elizabeth Henley, who married Jonathan Bayard Harrison Smith (1810–1889), a Washington D.C. lawyer, the son of Samuel Harrison Smith and Margaret Bayard, in 1842.
 Eliza Henley (b. 1828), who married Admiral Stephen Bleecker Luce (1827–1917).

Descendants
Through his second daughter, he was the grandfather of John Henley Smith (c. 1844–1907), who married Rebecca Young, Samuel Harrison Smith, who married Alive Hall, and Bayard Thornton Smith (b. 1857), who married Eleanor J. Hyde (the daughter of George Hyde, an early settler and the Alcalde of San Francisco) in 1882.

Through his youngest daughter, he was the grandfather of Caroline Luce (1857-1933), was the wife of Montgomery M. Macomb (1852–1924), a brigadier general in the United States Army.

Lecgacy
The destroyer USS John D. Henley (DD-553) was named in his honor.  See USS Henley for other ships named after John D. Henley and his brother, Robert Henley.

See also
 USS Henley
 USS John D. Henley (DD-553)

References
Notes

Sources

External links
John D. Henley Letterbook, 1808-1812, MS 38 held by Special Collections & Archives, Nimitz Library at the United States Naval Academy
Henley's Watch-, Quarter-, and Station-Bill of the U.S.S. John Adams and the U.S.S. Congress, 1818-1819, MS 73 held by Special Collections & Archives, Nimitz Library at the United States Naval Academy

1781 births
1835 deaths
American military personnel of the First Barbary War
United States Navy personnel of the War of 1812
United States Navy officers
People from Williamsburg, Virginia